This is a list of television broadcasters which provide coverage of the Czech First League, Czech football's top level competition.

International broadcasters

Europe (UEFA) 

Association football on television